PopCon Indy (formerly known as Indy PopCon) is a pop culture convention that has been held at the Indiana Convention Center since 2014.

PopCon Indy came to public recognition on November 18, 2013, when they launched a campaign on Kickstarter with an initial funding goal of $12,000. Funding was successful, with $16,584 being raised by 135 backers. The inaugural PopCon Indy was held on May 30–June 1, 2014 which had an attendance of 9,000. Indy PopCon 2016 was held on June 17th-June 19th which had an attendance record of 30,000.

2020 will be a virtual event as the COVID-19 pandemic cancelled most of the PopCon's events.

Guest Lineups
2014: 
Nicholas Brendon, John DiMaggio, Joel Hodgson, Sylvester McCoy, Paul and Storm

2015: 
Sophie Aldred, Troy Baker, Anna Faith, John de Lancie, Lloyd Kaufman, Lauren Landa, Edward James Olmos, Peter Spellos, Sarah Anne Williams

2016: 
501st Legion, Jon Bailey, Steve Cardenas, David Eddings, Sam Ellis, Jennifer Hale, Kyle Hebert, Lloyd Kaufman, Charles Martinet, Elizabeth Maxwell, Nolan North, Andy Price, Scott Ramsoomair, Malcolm Ray, Kevin Smith, StevRayBro, Tara Strong, Meg Turney, Mark Waid, Rob Walker

2017: 
Troy Baker, Johnny Yong Bosch, Charlet Chung, Jonny Cruz, Sam Ellis, Caitlin Glass, Greg Grunberg, Jess Harnell, Haiden Hazard, Richard Horvitz, Lloyd Kaufman, Phil LaMarr, Michelle "Mogchelle" Mussoni, ProJared, Nicki Taylor, Garrett Wang, Timothy Zahn

2018: 
Nick Bradshaw, LeVar Burton, Jason Faunt, Tony Fleecs, Elizabeth Henstridge, Brittney Karbowski, Pom Klementieff, Michelle "Mogchelle" Mussoni, Kristian Nairn, Lucie Pohl, Andy Price, Carolina Ravassa, Sara Richard, Jim Steranko, Ben Templesmith, Chris Uminga, Wil Wheaton, David Yost, Chrissie Zullo

2019: 
Ani-Mia, Anjali Bhimani, Jason David Frank, Richard Horvitz, Phil LaMarr, Howard Mackie, Vanessa Marshall, Brandon McInnis, Monica Rial, Alex Saviuk, John Wesley Shipp, David Sobolov, Fred Tatasciore, J. Michael Tatum, Mark Texeira, Doug Walker

2021: 
Caleb Hyles (announced), Arlo (Announced), Jim O'Heir (announced), Jason Faunt (announced), Erin Cahill (announced), Michael Copon (announced), Arryn Zech (announced), Kara Eberle (announced), Jason Liebrecht (announced), Elizabeth Maxwell (announced)

References

External links 
 

Recurring events established in 2014
Conventions in Indiana
Multigenre conventions
Festivals in Indianapolis